The 2021 VFL Women's season was the fifth season of the VFL Women's (VFLW). The season commenced on 27 February and was eventually curtailed on 10 September 2021 by the COVID-19 pandemic in Victoria, causing the grand final to be cancelled and no premiership awarded.  were recognised as the minor premiers for their undefeated regular season.

Clubs

Ladder

Finals series
Match-ups set using the second McIntyre final six system.

Elimination and Qualifying finals

Semi finals

Preliminary final

Grand Final

Awards
 Lambert-Pearce Medal (Best and Fairest):  Georgia Nanscawen – 17 votes
 Rohenna Young Medal (Leading Goal kicker):  Imogen Barnett – 20 goals
 Debbie Lee Medal (Rising Star):  Eliza West 
 Coach of the Year:  Chloe McMillan
 Lisa Hardeman Medal (Best on ground VFL Women's Grand Final):  Not awarded

Club best and fairest winners

See also
 2021 VFL season

References

External links
 Official website

 
V
VFL Women's season